Kirovograd was a  cargo ship that was built in 1929 as Hercules by AG Weser, Bremen, Germany for Dampfschiffahrts-Gesellschaft Neptun. She was seized by the British in May 1945, passed to the Ministry of War Transport (MoWT) and renamed Empire Dovey. In 1946, she was transferred to the Soviet Union under the terms of the Potsdam Agreement and renamed Kirovograd. She served until 1968, when she was scrapped.

Description
The ship was built in 1929 by AG Weser, Bremen.

The ship was propelled by a triple expansion steam engine.

History
Hercules was built in 1929 for Dampfschiffahrts-Gesellschaft Neptun, Bremen. In 1940, she was requisitioned by the Kriegsmarine, returning to Dampfschiffahrts-Gesellschaft Neptun later that year. Hercules was requisitioned again in 1941 and returned to her owners again in 1942.

In May 1945, she was seized by the Allies at Copenhagen, Denmark. On 23 June she was declared a prize of war, along with her cargo, which included 1½ tons of grease, which was sold by public tender in January 1946. Hercules was passed to the MoWT and renamed Empire Dovey. The United Kingdom Official Number 180601 and Code Letters GDYV were allocated. Her port of registry was London. In February 1946, Empire Dovey was transferred to the Soviet Union under the terms of the Potsdam Agreement. She was renamed Kirovograd. On 11 July 1960, she collided with the motor barge Gladys in the Medway Estuary off the Isle of Grain, Kent, United Kingdom. The barge sank. Kirovograd served until September 1968, when she was scrapped in West Germany.

References

1929 ships
Ships built in Bremen (state)
Steamships of Germany
Merchant ships of Germany
World War II merchant ships of Germany
Empire ships
Ministry of War Transport ships
Steamships of the United Kingdom
Merchant ships of the United Kingdom
Steamships of the Soviet Union
Merchant ships of the Soviet Union
Maritime incidents in 1960